Paul Andrew Ryczek (born June 25, 1952) is a former was an American football center who played professionally in the National Football League (NFL) for the Atlanta Falcons, the New Orleans Saints, and the Philadelphia Eagles. He played college football at the University of Virginia. Ryczek's brother, Dan, also played for the University of Virginia and in the NFL.

After his NFL career, Ryczek founded a construction company called Metaschematics. Ryczek is son of Stanley J. Ryczek (1921–1986) and Helen Gorman Ryczek (1928–2004). He and his wife, Carol, have three children: Zachary, Matthew and Elizabeth, who are all graduates of the University of Georgia.

References

External links
 

1952 births
Living people
American football centers
Atlanta Falcons players
New Orleans Saints players
Philadelphia Eagles players
Virginia Cavaliers football players
Mentor High School alumni
People from Painesville, Ohio
Sportspeople from Greater Cleveland
Players of American football from Ohio